This is a list of current and defunct automobile manufacturers of Malaysia.

Current manufacturers
 Bufori (1986–present)
 EV Innovations
 Perodua (1992–present) 
 Proton (1983–present)
 TD2000 (1998–present)

Current contract manufacturers and joint ventures
 Berjaya Auto (1984–present) manufactures and distributes for the following companies in Malaysia:
 Kia
 Mazda
 Peugeot
 Bermaz manufactures and distributes for the following companies in Malaysia:
 Kia
 Mazda
 Peugeot
 HICOM Automobile Manufacturers (1983–present) manufactures and distributes for the following companies in Malaysia: 
 Mercedes-Benz
 Volkswagen
 Inokom (1992–present) manufactures and distributes for the following companies in Malaysia:
 BMW
 Mini
 Hyundai
 Mazda 
 Sime Darby Motors
 BMW (Sime Darby Auto Bavaria)
 Ford (Sime Darby Auto ConneXion)
 Hyundai (Hyundai-Sime Darby Motors)
 Tan Chong Motor (1972–present) manufactures and distributes for the following companies in Malaysia:
 Nissan
 UMW Holdings (1987–present) manufactures and distributes for the following companies in Malaysia:
 Toyota (UMW Toyota Motor)

Foreign companies manufacturing in Malaysia
 Volvo Car Manufacturing Malaysia (1966–present)
 Honda Malaysia (2003–present)

Former manufacturers
 Esna (2005)
 Perusahaan Otomobil Elektrik (1996–mid 2000s)

Former contract manufacturers
 Naza Automotive Manufacturing (2002–present (no longer builds cars)) manufactured and distributed for the following companies in Malaysia: 
 Citroën
 DS
 Hafei
 Kia
 Peugeot

References

Automotive industry in Malaysia
Malaysia